The following 'List of Tree Species' in Cambodia has been based on one prepared in 2004 with the support of DANIDA project; the original document gives Khmer names for species shown here (with corrections and links).

See also
 Wildlife of Cambodia
 Seasonal tropical forest
 Deforestation in Cambodia

References and Notes

Trees of Cambodia
Flora of Indo-China
Trees
Cambodia